Chairman David Windsor  

Whitchurch Rugby Club is an amateur rugby union club in Whitchurch, Shropshire. The club was formed in 1936 and currently competes in the Midlands 1 West league since their promotion into the division as champions of Midlands 2 West (North) at the end of the 2017–18 season. Until the early 1970s, the club relied mainly on the facilities of the local Grammar School until the move to Edgeley Park where they now reside.

Club history
In 1959 a pre-fabricated club house was opened in the town and then in 1970 a pitch was acquired on Edgeley Park followed in 1974 by a new clubhouse and changing rooms on the same site.

Mini, junior, colts ladies and more senior teams followed. A major fire in 1986 did not prevent the club celebrating its golden jubilee that year and its diamond ten years later

By the 1980s Whitchurch established themselves as the leading Shropshire rugby union club; winning 9 from 11 county cups, becoming the first Shropshire club to secure the North Midlands Cup in 1997, again in 1999, and finalists in May 2005. The Senior team was placed in the North Midlands 1 division of the Courage League in 1987 and they progressed to Midlands 1 status in 1994. After the team won all 16 of their games in the 1997/98 season, Whitchurch were promoted to National Division Three North in 1998/99, which was maintained until 2002/3 when they dropped to Midlands 1 and in 2005/06 North 1. The club currently competes in the Midlands 1 West league.

Investment in clubhouse facilities in 1975 and again in 2004, with the opening of a new stand, ensured that the club maintained their position as one of the leading sporting clubs in the area. Every week four full size pitches accommodate four senior men's sides, 1 ladies XV, under 19's, under 17's plus the mini and junior teams.

Whitchurch RUFC has a dedicated youth structure and has produced some top rugby players over the years. Current Northampton Saints number eight, Mark Hopley began his playing career in the mini and junior teams at Whitchurch.

Club honours
North Midlands 1 champions: 1990–91
Midlands 2 champions: 1993–94
North Midlands Cup winners (2): 1996–97, 1998–99
Midlands 1 champions: 1997–98
North Midlands Cup Plate winners: 2015–16
Midlands 2 West (North) champions: 2017–18

References

External links
Whitchurch Rugby Club

English rugby union teams
Rugby clubs established in 1936
Rugby union in Shropshire
Sport in Whitchurch, Shropshire
Whitchurch, Shropshire